Overland Stage Raiders is a 1938 "Three Mesquiteers" Western film starring John Wayne and directed by George Sherman. The film is notable for being the final film in which silent film icon Louise Brooks performed. Wayne played the lead in eight of the fifty-one films in the popular series.

It was filmed on location at Iverson Movie Ranch in Chatsworth, Los Angeles, and at the now defunct Conejo Valley Airport in Thousand Oaks, California.

Plot summary

Cast

 John Wayne as Stony Brooke
 Ray Corrigan as Tucson Smith
 Max Terhune as Lullaby Joslin
 Louise Brooks as Beth Hoyt
 Elmer as Elmer (Lullaby's Dummy) (uncredited) 
 Anthony Marsh as Ned Hoyt
 John Archer as Bob Whitney 
 Gordon Hart as W. T.Mullins
 Roy James as Dave Harmon
 Olin Francis as Henchman Jake
 Fern Emmett as Ma Hawkins
 Henry Otho as Sheriff Mason
 George Sherwood as Henchman Clanton
 Arch Hall Sr. as Joe Waddell
 Frank LaRue as Hank Milton
 Edwin Gaffney as Gat (Eastern Gangster)  (uncredited) 
 Slim Whitaker as Pete Hawkins (uncredited)
 Chuck Baldra as Henchman (uncredited)
 Burr Caruth as Evans (uncredited) 
 Curley Dresden as Rancher (uncredited)
 John Beach as Henchman (uncredited)
 Duke R. Lee as An Investor (uncredited)
 Tommy Coats as Henchman (uncredited)  
 Bud McClure as Rancher (uncredited
 George Morrell as Rancher (uncredited)
 Yakima Canutt as Bus Driver (uncredited)
 Bud Osborne as Rancher (uncredited) 
 Charles Brinley as Rancher (uncredited) 
 Jack Kirk as Henchman (uncredited) 
 Bill Wolfe as Rancher (uncredited)
 George Plues as Henchman (uncredited) 
 Dirk Thane as Dutch (Eastern Gangster)  (uncredited) 
 Milton Kibbee as Airline Passenger (uncredited) 
 Fred Burns as Rancher (uncredited)

See also
 John Wayne filmography

References

External links
 
 
 
 

1938 films
1938 Western (genre) films
American Western (genre) films
American black-and-white films
Films directed by George Sherman
Films with screenplays by Bernard McConville
Three Mesquiteers films
Republic Pictures films
1930s American films